"Kiss (When the Sun Don't Shine)" is a song by Dutch Eurodance group Vengaboys. It was released in November 1999 as the lead single from their third studio album, The Platinum Album (2000). The song reached number one on the New Zealand Singles Chart and peaked within the top 10 in Canada, Denmark, Flanders, Germany, Iceland, Ireland, the Netherlands, Spain, Sweden, and the United Kingdom.

Critical reception
AllMusic described the song as a "hi-energy dance anthem" in their review of The Platinum Album.

Music video
The music video for "Kiss (When the Sun Don't Shine)" was shot in Tokyo during the Vengaboys Millennium world tour. It features the Para Para, a synchronized dance that originated in Japan.

Track listings

 Dutch CD single
 "Kiss (When the Sun Don't Shine)" (Hitradio) – 3:31
 "Kiss (When the Sun Don't Shine)" (DJ Jean Remix) – 8:03

 Dutch maxi-CD single
 "Kiss (When the Sun Don't Shine)" (Hitradio) – 3:31
 "Kiss (When the Sun Don't Shine)" (Hitradio XXL) – 5:25
 "Kiss (When the Sun Don't Shine)" (karaoke) – 3:31
 "Kiss (When the Sun Don't Shine)" (DJ Jean Remix) – 8:03
 "Kiss (When the Sun Don't Shine)" (Airscape Remix) – 8:59
 "Kiss (When the Sun Don't Shine)" (Southside Spinners Remix) – 8:12
 "Vengababes from Outer Space" – 3:25
 "Kiss (When the Sun Don't Shine)" (video) – 3:31

 European CD single
 "Kiss (When the Sun Don't Shine)" (Hitradio) – 3:31
 "Kiss (When the Sun Don't Shine)" (Hitradio XXL) – 5:25

 UK cassette single
 "Kiss (When the Sun Don't Shine)" (Hitradio) – 3:33
 "Kiss (When the Sun Don't Shine)" (XXL mix) – 5:25
 "Kiss (When the Sun Don't Shine)" (karaoke) – 3:33

 UK CD1
 "Kiss (When the Sun Don't Shine)" (Hitradio) – 3:33
 "Kiss (When the Sun Don't Shine)" (XXL mix) – 5:25
 "Kiss (When the Sun Don't Shine)" (karaoke) – 3:33
 "Kiss (When the Sun Don't Shine)" (DJ Jean Remix) – 6:53
 "Kiss (When the Sun Don't Shine)" (video)

 UK CD2
 "Kiss (When the Sun Don't Shine)" (Hitradio) – 3:33
 "Kiss (When the Sun Don't Shine)" (Airscape Remix) – 9:01
 "Boom, Boom, Boom, Boom!!" (Marc van Dale with Enrico Remix) – 6:32

 Australian CD single
 "Kiss (When the Sun Don't Shine)" (Hitradio) – 3:33
 "Kiss (When the Sun Don't Shine)" (DJ Jean Remix) – 6:53
 "Kiss (When the Sun Don't Shine)" (XXL mix) – 5:25
 "Kiss (When the Sun Don't Shine)" (Airscape Remix) – 9:01
 "Kiss (When the Sun Don't Shine)" (video)

Charts

Weekly charts

Year-end charts

Certifications

Release history

References

1999 singles
1999 songs
Atlantic Records singles
Jive Records singles
Number-one singles in New Zealand
Number-one singles in Scotland
Positiva Records singles
Songs written by Dennis van den Driesschen
Songs written by Wessel van Diepen
Tokyo in fiction
Vengaboys songs